NKY may refer to:

Northern Kentucky, a geographical region in the United States
Yokangassi Airport, an airport in the Republic of the Congo with that IATA airport code